The World Commission on Protected Areas (WCPA) is one of six commissions of the International Union for Conservation of Nature (IUCN).

History 
In 1948, the IUCN established a Committee on National Parks. Two decades later the IUCN had been asked by the international community to take responsibility for preparing a world list of national parks in keeping with its role as a network to share the world’s knowledge on nature conservation, and in 1960, the IUCN raised the status of the Committee to that of a permanent Commission, with the creation of the Commission on National Parks. In 1996, the World Commission on Protected Areas took on its current name with the approval of the IUCN congress.

Organizational structure 
WCPA is a network of volunteers. Secretariat support is provided by staff of the IUCN Programme on Protected Areas, with whom WCPA implements a shared strategic plan and work plan. The Commission has a Steering Committee, and the Chair is elected every four years at the IUCN World Conservation Congress. The World Conservation Congress is set for June 11 to 19, 2019, in Marseilles, France.

The WCPA Steering Committee is the principal governing body of WCPA. The Steering Committee is appointed by the WCPA Chair and approved by the IUCN Council. The Steering Committee is composed of the Chair, the Deputy Chair, Regional Vice‐Chairs, and Thematic Vice‐Chairs. WCPA Steering Committee meetings occur once a year and include reporting on IUCN Global Protected Areas Programme (GPAP) and WCPA activities, discussion and decisions on important upcoming events and initiatives, review of the GPAP Intersessional Programme, and discussion and decisions on WCPA directions and priorities for the upcoming year.

Regional Vice Chairs for 13 terrestrial regions, include:

 Eastern and Southern Africa
 North Africa, West Asia, and Middle East
 West and Central Africa
 Caribbean and Central America
 North America
 South America
 East Asia
 South Asia
 Southeast Asia
 Europe
 North Eurasia
 Oceania

Thematic Vice Chairs include those for:

 Capacity Development
 Governance
 Marine
 Natural Solutions
 People and Parks
 Science and Biodiversity
 Science and Management
 Young Professionals
 World Heritage

The Steering Committee also includes two seats for publications:

 Publications Editor
 PARKS Editor

The WCPA Executive Committee is the principal governing body of WCPA making decisions between Steering Committee Meetings. It is composed of the WCPA Chair, the WCPA Deputy Chair, Regional and Thematic Vice-Chairs, the Director of IUCN Global Protected Areas Program and others co-opted at the request of the Chair.

Current work 
To carry out its objectives, the WCPA has a number of Specialist Groups, Task Forces, Initiatives, and Thematic Groups which report to the WCPA Executive Committee.

Specialist groups 
Specialist Groups are established to bring together Commission Members who can provide ongoing specialist expertise and leadership in topics that are Commission and Programme Priorities. Current Specialist Groups include:

 Climate Change and Protected Areas
 Connectivity Conservation
 Cultural and Spiritual Values of Protected Areas
 Freshwater
 Geoheritage and Caves and Karst Protected Areas
 Governance
 Grasslands
 Green List
 High Seas
 Health and well-being
 Management Effectiveness
 Marine Mammals (jointly with SSC)
 Mountains
 Protected Area Finance
 Protected Area Legislation
 Privately Protected Areas and Nature Stewardship
 Protected Landscapes / Seascapes
 Tourism and Protected Areas
 Transboundary Conservation
 Urban Conservation Strategies
 Wilderness

Task forces 
Task Forces are established to accomplish a specific time-bound task, e.g. the preparation of a WCPA Best Practice Guideline publication or the preparation of a particular policy. Current Task Forces include:

 Beyond the Aichi Targets
 Biodiversity and Protected Areas (jointly with SSC)
 Health and Well-being
 Invasive Alien Species (jointly with SSC)
 Large scale Marine Protected Areas
 Nature For All (jointly with CEC)
 Other Effective area-based Conservation Measures (OECM)

Thematic Groups and Initiatives 
Thematic Groups and Initiatives contribute to the WCPA mandate by providing cross-cutting support to the Steering Committee, Specialist Groups, Task Forces, and Initiatives. Current thematic groups include:

 Capacity Development
 Marine
 Natural Solutions
 People and Parks
 Science and Biodiversity
 Science and Management
 World Heritage
 Young Professionals

See also
 International Union for Conservation of Nature
 National Park
 Natural Monument
 Paul F. J. Eagles
 Protected Area
 Protected Landscape
 Strict Nature Reserve
 WCPA High Seas Task Force
 Wilderness Area
 IUCN protected area categories

References

Nature conservation organisations based in Europe
International scientific organizations
IUCN commissions